Yüksek (or Yüksekköy) is a village in Tarsus district of Mersin Province, Turkey. The population of Yüksek was 174  as of 2012.

References

Villages in Tarsus District